The 2011 NCAA Division I Men's Lacrosse Championship was the 41st annual single-elimination tournament to determine the national championship for National Collegiate Athletic Association (NCAA) Division I men's college lacrosse. Sixteen teams were selected to compete in the tournament based upon their performance during the regular season, and for some, by means of a conference tournament.

The championship game took place on May 30, 2011 at M&T Bank Stadium in Baltimore, Maryland, where Virginia won its fifth NCAA lacrosse championship and seventh college title overall, defeating Maryland 9–7 in the title game. Maryland became only the fourth unseeded team to reach the finals and the second unseeded in a row. This was the first all-ACC title game since the 1986 championship.

During the tournament, Virginia head coach Dom Starsia became the winningest coach in Division I men's lacrosse history, earning his 327th career win in the quarterfinals against Cornell, surpassing Jack Emmer's record of 326. In addition, the first-round match between Denver and Villanova, held at Peter Barton Lacrosse Stadium on the DU campus on May 15, was historically notable as the first Division I men's tournament game ever to be held west of the Mississippi River.

Tournament bracket

 * = Overtime

References

External links
 Tournament statistics via NCAA

NCAA Division I Men's Lacrosse Championship
NCAA Division I Men's Lacrosse Championship
NCAA Division I Men's Lacrosse Championship
Sports competitions in Baltimore
NCAA Division I Men's Lacrosse Championship